Hardway may refer to:

Places
 Hardway, Hampshire, a village and suburb of the town and borough of Gosport in Hampshire, England

Music
 Jay Hardway (born 1991), Dutch DJ and music producer
 Martin Zellar and The Hardways, an American band
Hard Way, album by Japanese hard rock band Show-Ya
"The Hardway", a song by DC Talk from the album Free at Last

Others
 Hard way, type of bet in craps
 Hardway, one of the three cleavage planes of granite

See also
 The Hard Way (disambiguation)
 Hardaway, surname